S. R. Russell can refer to:

 Steve Russell (computer scientist)
 Sam Russell (footballer born 1900)